Double Star is  a novel by Robert Heinlein.

Double Star may also refer to:
 Double star, a pair of stars that appear close to each other in the sky
 Double Star (board game), a board wargame by Game Designers' Workshop
 Double Star Mission, a joint Chinese/European satellite effort
 Qingdao DoubleStar, a team in the Chinese Basketball Association

See also
 Binary star